The Cowboy Artists of America (CAA) is an exclusive organization of artists that was founded in 1965.  It was founded in 1965 by four prominent western artists, Joe Beeler, Charlie Dye, John Hampton and George Phippen, who have all since died. Since its inception, the exclusive organization of artists has always been dedicated to portraying the lifestyles of the cowboy and the American West, both as it was and as it endures. The CAA was founded in 1965 in Sedona, Arizona and held its first art show in 1966 at the Cowboy Hall of Fame in Oklahoma City, Oklahoma. In 1973, the annual event moved to the Phoenix Art Museum.  In April 2011, the museum announced that it would no longer host the event.

In 2015, the CAA's 50th anniversary exhibition was to be held at the Scottsdale Museum of the West in Scottsdale, Arizona.

The artists' works, highly sought after by western collectors, often fetch high prices. As an example, Howard Terpning's Cooling Off the Hard Way sold for $305,000 at the 2003 Santa Fe Art Auction.

Members
As of 2015, the CAA had cumulatively had 77 artists as members.  Notable members have included:
Joe Beeler (1931-2006)
Charlie Dye
Phil Epp
John Hampton
George Phippen
Tom Ryan
Gordon Snidow
William Moyers
U. Grant Speed
James Boren
Fred Fellows
James Reynolds
Harvey W. Johnson
Bill Owen
Howard Terpning
Gary Carter
Frank McCarthy
Gary Niblett

Clark Kelley Price

Notes

References

External links
Cowboy Artists of America

American artist groups and collectives
Artists of the American West
Arts organizations established in 1965
1965 establishments in the United States